Tottempudi Gopichand (born 12 June 1979) is an Indian actor who works primarily in Telugu cinema. Known for his roles in action films, he made his debut with Tholi Valapu (2001) in a lead role. After playing an antagonist in films such as Jayam (2002), Nijam (2003) and Varsham (2004), he got his breakthrough with Yagnam in 2004.

His notable works include Yagnam (2004), Andhrudu (2005), Ranam (2006), Lakshyam(2007),Souryam (2008), Golimaar (2010), Sahasam (2013), Loukyam (2014), Jil (2015), Seetimaarr (2021), and Pakka Commercial (2022). He is fondly referred to as Action Star and Macho Star.

Early life
Gopichand was born in a village near Tangutur in Prakasam district, Andhra Pradesh. He is the younger son of the filmmaker T. Krishna and was 8 years old when his father died. He was schooled at Nil Desperandum, Ongole (established by his father) and Ramakrishna Mission school, Chennai. He studied mechanical engineering in Russia.

His elder brother Premchand was an associate director under Muthyala Subbaiah and started working as a director; however, he died in a car accident. Gopichand was in Russia at that time and could not attend his funeral due to visa issues. He also has a younger sister, who is a dentist.

After completing his engineering, he decided to pursue a career in films to continue his father's legacy and did a dialogue modulation course for a year.  He is a close friend of actor Prabhas.

Career
Gopichand made his debut as a lead with the film Tholi Valapu. He played negative roles in his next films Jayam, Nijam and Varsham. Following the positive reception towards his performance in Jayam, he reprised his role in the film's Tamil-language remake of the same title. He made his re-entry as hero with the films Yagnam in 2004 and Andhrudu in 2005. In 2006, he starred in the commercially successful Ranam and the commercially unsuccessful Raraju. His 2007 releases Okkadunnadu and Lakshyam, and the 2008 releases were Ontari and Souryam. He collaborated once again with Souryam director Siva for their 2009 release Sankham.

His 2010 release Golimar saw him playing an encounter specialist inspired by the real-life cop Daya Nayak. In 2011, he acted in Mogudu and Wanted but both were commercial failures. In 2013, he reunited with director Chandra Sekhar Yeleti (after Okkadunnadu) for the action-adventure film Sahasam which became his biggest commercially successful film at that time. In 2014, he starred in Loukyam commercially became his most successful film. In 2015, he starred in Jil and Soukhyam. In 2017, he starred in Goutham Nanda and Oxygen which were both commercially unsuccessful. His next film Aaradugula Bullet was slated to release the same year but did not materialize until 2021. It turned out to be a routine drama, suffering another setback. In 2018, he played a vigilante in Pantham, which was his 25th film. In 2019, he played a spy in Chanakya.

, his sports action film Seetimaarr, directed by Sampath Nandi received positive reviews and was a success in the box office. The film star co-stars Tamannaah, Digangana Suryavanshi, Bhumika Chawla. He has also worked on another film, Pakka Commercial which was directed by Maruthi and produced by UV Creations and GA2 Pictures starring Rashi Khanna as the lead heroine.His next movie, RamaBanam, directed by Sriwass was announced on January 2023. This film marks the return of the hatrick combination of Sriwass and Gopichand also marking as the 30th film of Gopichand.

Personal life
He was born and raised in Tangutur, Andra Pradesh. He married Reshma, niece of Telugu actor Srikanth in 2013. The couple has two sons.

Filmography

Awards and nominations

References

External links

Living people
1979 births
Male actors in Telugu cinema
Indian male film actors
Telugu male actors
Nandi Award winners
21st-century Indian male actors
Male actors in Tamil cinema
People from Prakasam district
Male actors from Andhra Pradesh